Gerardo Fabián Barbero (21 August 1961 – 4 March 2001) was an Argentine chess grandmaster. He was born in Lanús, Buenos Aires, and raised in  Rosario, Santa Fe.

Barbero came fifth in the World Junior Chess Championship of 1978. He was Argentine champion in 1984 and played on board one for the Chess Olympiad team in 1990. He played six times for Argentina, between 1978 and 1994, at the Chess Olympiads. Barbero was awarded the title of Grandmaster in 1987.

In 1986 he moved to Budapest, Hungary, where he was married and had a son. In Hungary, he developed a friendship with Bobby Fischer, who, according to GM Eugenio Torre, "liked Barbero". He died in Budapest of cancer in 2001.

The third chapter of Tibor Karolyi's 2009 book Genius in the Background is devoted to him.

Sample game
 
Barbero had a win against Bent Larsen in Buenos Aires in 1991:

1.d4 Nf6 2.c4 e6 3.Nf3 d5 4.Nc3 c6 5.e3 Nbd7 6.Qc2 Be7 7.b3 a6 8.Bd3 b5 9.0-0 0-0 10.e4 b4 11.Na4 dxe4 12.Bxe4 Bb7 13.Bg5 Nxe4 14.Bxe7 Qxe7 15.Qxe4 Rab8 16.c5 a5 17.Rfe1 Rbd8 18.a3 Nf6 19.Qh4 Ba6 20.axb4 axb4 21.Nb6 Bb5 22.Qf4 Rb8 23.Ne5 Rfd8 24.Re3 Rb7
25.g4 Ra7 26.Rae1 Ne8 27.g5 f6 28.Nf3 Nc7 29.gxf6 gxf6 30.Nh4 Qf7 31.Kh1 Kh8 32.Rg1 Qf8 33.Ng6+ hxg6 34.Rh3+ 1–0

References

Further reading

External links
Gerardo F Barbero chess games at 365Chess.com

1961 births
2001 deaths
Chess grandmasters
Argentine chess players
People from Lanús
Sportspeople from Rosario, Santa Fe
Deaths from cancer in Hungary
20th-century chess players